Guilty of Love may refer to:

 "Guilty of Love" (song), a song by Whitesnake
 "Guilty of Love", a single by Shanadoo
 Guilty of Love (film), a lost 1920 American silent drama film